Eleni Daniilidou and Jasmin Wöhr were the defending champions, but both chose not to participate.
Nina Bratchikova and Darija Jurak won the title, defeating Alexandra Cadanțu and Ioana Raluca Olaru 6–4, 7–5 in the final.

Seeds

Draw

Draw

References
 Main Draw

Allianz Cup - Doubles